Polish Film Award, or Eagle is a film awards ceremony given annually since 1999,<ref>[https://www.imdb.com/event/ev0000887/1999 Awards for 1999] at the IMDb</ref> with the first event held on 21 June, by the National Chamber of Audiovisual Producers (KIPA). Since 2003 they are given out by the Polish Film Academy. Their status in the Polish film industry can be compared with Academy Awards.

Awards
List of main categories:

 Best Film – since 1999
 Best Actor – since 1999
 Best Actress – since 1999
 Supporting Actor – since 2000
 Supporting Actress – since 2000
 Documentary – since 2013
 Film Score – since 1999
 Director – since 1999
 Screenplay – since 1999
 Cinematography – since 1999
 Costume Design – since 2001
 Sound – since 1999
 Editing – since 1999
 Production Design – since 1999
 European Film – since 2005
 Producer – 1999–2001
 Discovery of the Year - since 2008
 TV series – since 2015

Special awards:

 Audience Award
 Special Award
 Life Achievement Award

 Wins and nominations
 List of films with five or more awards
 11 wins – Corpus Christi (2019) (15 nominations)
 10 wins – Silent Night (2018) (11 nominations)
 9 wins – Volhynia (2017) (14 nominations)
 8 wins – Reverse (2009) (13 nominations)
 8 wins – The Pianist (2002) (13 nominations)
 7 wins – 25 Years of Innocence (2020) (15 nominations)
 7 wins – Cold War (2019) (12 nominations)
 7 wins – Gods (2015) (13 nominations)
 7 wins – Rose (2011) (8 nominations)
 7 wins – Katyń (2007) (11 nominations)
 7 wins – Jasminum (2006) (9 nominations)
 7 wins – The Collector (2005) (8 nominations)
 7 wins – Life as a Fatal Sexually Transmitted Disease (12 nominations)
 6 wins – The Wedding (2004) (10 nominations)
 6 wins – My Nikifor (2004) (10 nominations)
 6 wins – Pan Tadeusz (1999) (11 nominations)
 5 wins – Little Moscow (2008) (8 nominations)
 5 wins – Zmruż oczy (2003) (8 nominacji)
 5 wins – Pornografia (2003) (9 nominations)
 5 wins – Cześć Tereska (2001) (10 nominations)
 5 wins – The Debt (1998) (10 nominations)

 List of films with ten or more nominations

 Directors with two or more awards

 Most wins by actresses 
 Kinga Preis – 16 nominations, 6 awards
 Agata Kulesza – 10 nominations, 4 awards
 Aleksandra Konieczna – 3 nominations, 3 awards
 Stanisława Celińska – 5 nominations, 2 awards
 Danuta Szaflarska – 5 nominations, 2 awards
 Maja Ostaszewska – 5 nominations, 2 awards
 Danuta Stenka – 4 nominations, 2 awards
 Joanna Kulig – 3 nominations, 2 awards
 Dominika Ostałowska – 3 nominations, 2 awards
 Krystyna Feldman – 2 nominations, 2 awards

 Most wins by actors 
 Janusz Gajos – 12 nominations, 5 awards
 Robert Więckiewicz – 8 nominations, 5 awards
 Arkadiusz Jakubik – 9 nominations, 4 awards
 Jan Frycz – 8 nominations, 3 awards
 Jacek Braciak – 5 nominations, 3 awards
 Andrzej Chyra – 7 nominations, 2 awards
 Dawid Ogrodnik - 5 nominations, 2 awards
 Zbigniew Zamachowski – 5 nominations, 2 awards

 Most nominations 
 Kinga Preis – 16 nominations for best actress
 Marek Wronko – 12 nominations for best sound editing
 Wojciech Kilar – 10 nominations for best score
 Wanda Zeman – 10 nominations for best film editing
 Magdalena Biedrzycka – 10 nominations for best costume design
 Jagna Janicka – 10 nominations (7 for best costume design and 3 for best production design)
 Nikodem Wołk-Łaniewski – 9 nominations for sound editing
 Janusz Gajos – 9 nominations for best actor

 Most wins overall
 Krzysztof Ptak – 7 awards for best cinematography
 Jacek Hamela – 6 awards for best sound editing
 Kinga Preis – 5 awards for best actress
 Janusz Gajos – 5 awards (4 for best actor and 1 lifetime achievement award)
 Wojciech Kilar – 4 awards for best score
 Robert Więckiewicz – 4 awards for best actor

 "Big Five" winners and nominees 
The following is a list of films that won the awards for Best Film, Director, Actor, Actress and Screenplay. 

 Winners
 The Collector (2005)
 Best Film: The Collector Best Director: Feliks Falk
 Best Screenplay: Feliks Falk
 Best Actress: Kinga Preis
 Best Actor: Andrzej Chyra

 Corpus Christi (2019)

 Best Film: Corpus Christi Best Director: Jan Komasa
 Best Screenplay: Mateusz Pacewicz
 Best Actress: Aleksandra Konieczna 
 Best Actor: Bartosz Bielenia

 Nominees
 Four awards won
 Life as a Fatal Sexually Transmitted Disease  (2000): Best Film, Best Director (Krzysztof Zanussi), Best Screenplay (Krzysztof Zanussi) and Best Actor (Zbigniew Zapasiewicz); lost: Best Actress (Krystyna Janda)
 Cześć Tereska (2001): Best Film, Best Director (Robert Gliński), Best Screenplay (Jacek Wyszomirski) and Best Actor (Zbigniew Zamachowski); lost: Best Actress (Aleksandra Gietner)
 Zmruż oczy (2002): Best Film, Best Director (Andrzej Jakimowski), Best Screenplay (Andrzej Jakimowski) and Best Actor (Zbigniew Zamachowski); lost: Best Actress (Aleksandra Prószyńska)
 Róża (2012): Best Film, Best Director (Wojciech Smarzowski), Best Screenplay (Michał Szczerbic) and Best Actress (Agata Kulesza); lost: Best Actor (Marcin Dorociński)
 Body/Ciało (2016): Best Film, Best Director (Małgorzata Szumowska), Best Actor (Janusz Gajos) and Best Actress (Maja Ostaszewska); lost: Best Screenplay (Michał Englert, Małgorzata Szumowska) 
 Cold War (2018): Best Film, Best Director (Paweł Pawlikowski), Best Screenplay (Janusz Głowacki and Paweł Pawlikowski) and Best Actress (Joanna Kulig); lost: Best Actor (Tomasz Kot)

 Three awards won
 Reverse (2009): Best Film, Best Screenplay (Andrzej Bart) and Best Actress (Agata Buzek); lost: Best Director (Borys Lankosz), Best Actor (Marcin Dorociński)
 Ostatnia rodzina'' (2017): Best Screenplay (Robert Bolesto), Best Actor (Andrzej Seweryn) and Best Actress (Aleksandra Konieczna); lost: Best Film, lost Best Direcotr (Jan P. Matuszyński)

See also
Gdynia Film Festival
Polish cinema

References

External links
 Official website 
 Polish Film Awards at Internet Movie Database

1999 establishments in Poland
Polish awards
Polish film awards
Awards established in 1999